Gary C. Aklestad (born December 9, 1932) is an American politician in the state of Montana. He served in the Montana State Senate from 1977 to 1997. In 1997 he served as President of the Senate and in 1995 he was President pro tempore. He also served as minority leader in 1987.

References

1932 births
Living people
Republican Party Montana state senators
Presidents of the Montana Senate
People from Shelby, Montana